Electric guitar may refer to:

Electric guitar, a musical instrument
Electric twelve-string guitar
Electric acoustic guitar
Electric bass guitar
 "Electric Guitar" (song), a song by the English electronic music band Fluke
 "Electric Guitar", a song by Talking Heads from their album Fear of Music
Electric Guitars, an English band
"Electric Guitars", a song by Prefab Sprout from the album Andromeda Heights